Vitis popenoei, commonly called the totoloche, or totoloche grape, is a New World species of liana in the grape family native to Belize, Mexico (Chiapas, Hidalgo, Oaxaca, Puebla, Tabasco, Veracruz, and eastern Querétaro), and north-central Guatemala (Alta Verapaz).

See also
Muscadine

References

External links
Two links from the Hunt Institute for Botanical Documentation:1. Drawing from the original publication2.  Documentation for same drawing

popenoei
Plants described in 1940
Flora of Belize
Flora of Guatemala
Flora of Mexico